Lynchburg is a town in Sumter and Lee County, South Carolina, United States. The population was 373 at the 2010 census.

History
Lynchburg Presbyterian Church and Tanglewood Plantation are listed on the National Register of Historic Places.

Geography
Lynchburg is located at  (34.060645, -80.077323).

Demographics

As of the census of 2000, there were 588 people, 222 households, and 138 families residing in the town. The population density was 519.7 people per square mile (200.9/km2). There were 262 housing units at an average density of 231.5 per square mile (89.5/km2). The racial makeup of the town was 73.64% African American, 17.35% White, 8.50% from other races, and 0.51% from two or more races. Hispanic or Latino of any race were 8.67% of the population.

There were 222 households, out of which 29.7% had children under the age of 18 living with them, 32.4% were married couples living together, 27.0% had a female householder with no husband present, and 37.4% were non-families. 32.9% of all households were made up of individuals, and 14.4% had someone living alone who was 65 years of age or older. The average household size was 2.65 and the average family size was 3.29.

In the town, the population was spread out, with 26.0% under the age of 18, 14.3% from 18 to 24, 26.5% from 25 to 44, 19.4% from 45 to 64, and 13.8% who were 65 years of age or older. The median age was 33 years. For every 100 females, there were 94.7 males. For every 100 females age 18 and over, there were 87.5 males.

The median income for a household in the town was $19,250, and the median income for a family was $33,750. Males had a median income of $22,125 versus $19,318 for females. The per capita income for the town was $14,608. About 31.1% of the population were below the poverty line, including 34.2% of those under age 18 and 44.2% of those age 65 or over.

References

Towns in Lee County, South Carolina
Towns in South Carolina